Seino Transportation Soccer Club was a Japanese football club based in Gifu. The club has played in Japan Soccer League Division 2.

In 2014, Seino Transportation became one of the sponsors of the spiritual successor club, F.C. Gifu.

External links
Football of Japan

Japan Soccer League clubs
1997 disestablishments in Japan
Sports teams in Gifu Prefecture
Japan Football League (1992–1998) clubs
Defunct football clubs in Japan
Association football clubs disestablished in 1997
Works association football clubs in Japan